Opitsvet Lake is the lake extending 420 m in west–east direction and 410 m in north–south direction on the southeast coast of Rozhen Peninsula, Livingston Island in the South Shetland Islands, Antarctica. It has a surface area of 11 ha and is separated from the waters of Brunow Bay on the east and Bransfield Strait on the south by a 70 to 150 m wide strip of land. The area was visited by early 19th century sealers.

The feature is named after the settlement of Opitsvet and the eponymous marsh in Western Bulgaria.

Location
Bulgarian mapping of the area in 2009 and 2017.

Maps
 L. Ivanov. Antarctica: Livingston Island and Greenwich, Robert, Snow and Smith Islands. Scale 1:120000 topographic map. Troyan: Manfred Wörner Foundation, 2009. 
 L. Ivanov. Antarctica: Livingston Island and Smith Island. Scale 1:100000 topographic map. Manfred Wörner Foundation, 2017. 
 Antarctic Digital Database (ADD). Scale 1:250000 topographic map of Antarctica. Scientific Committee on Antarctic Research (SCAR). Since 1993, regularly upgraded and updated

See also
 Antarctic lakes
 Livingston Island

Notes

References
 Opitsvet Lake. SCAR Composite Gazetteer of Antarctica
 Bulgarian Antarctic Gazetteer. Antarctic Place-names Commission. (details in Bulgarian, basic data in English)

External links
 Opitsvet Lake. Adjusted Copernix satellite image

Bodies of water of Livingston Island
Lakes of the South Shetland Islands
Bulgaria and the Antarctic